Thanos (Greek: Θάνος; ;) is a Greek masculine given name and surname, a short form (hypocorism) of Athanasios 'immortal'.

It may refer to the following:

People

Given name or nickname
 Athanasios Thanos Samaras (born 1973), Greek actor and artist
 Athanasios Thanos Kalliris (born 1962), Greek singer
 Thanos Leivaditis (1934–2005), Greek actor and screenwriter
 Athanasios Thanos Mikroutsikos (1947–2019), Greek composer and former politician
 Thanos Papalexis (born 1972), British businessman and convicted murderer
 Athanasios Thanos Petrelis (born 1975), Greek singer
 Athanasios Petsos (born 1991), Greek footballer
 Athanasios Thanos Plevris (born 1977), Greek politician
 Athanasios Thanos Pisanidis (born 1988), Greek actor and animal trainer.

Surname
 George Spiro Thanos (born 1952), American martial artist
 Konstantinos Thanos (born 1973), Greek wrestler who participated in the 2000 Summer Olympics
 John Thanos (1949–1994), American convicted murderer
 Indradi Thanos (born 1953), Indonesian police officer
 F.E. Thanos (1921–2003), Indonesian army officer

Fictional characters
 Thanos, a Marvel Comics supervillain
 Thanos (Marvel Cinematic Universe), the Marvel Cinematic Universe version of the character
 Thanos, a major character in the French language comic book series Lanfeust of Troy

See also
 Thanos simonattoi, a species of dinosaur
 Athanasius (given name), a list of people named Athanasius or Athanasios

Greek masculine given names
Hypocorisms